Shaun Keith Utterson (born 2 February 1990 in Newcastle upon Tyne, England) is an English footballer.

Career
Utterson started his career with Wallsend Boys Club. He went from Wallsend to Monkseaton Football Academy, where he was named 2007 young Player-of-the-Year. After the 2008 season, he joined UNC Wilmington Seahawks and played four years of college soccer at UNC Wilmington between 2008 and 2011. After graduating, he returned home to England and played for Conference North club Blyth Spartans in 2012.

Utterson returned to Wilmington in 2013, when he signed for USL Pro club Wilmington Hammerheads and played 22 games for the club in the USL Professional Division, before joined on loan to former club Blyth Spartans AFC. On 3 March 2014, he returned from England to Wilmington Hammerheads FC.

References

External links
 UNCW profile

1990 births
Living people
English footballers
English expatriate footballers
UNC Wilmington Seahawks men's soccer players
Blyth Spartans A.F.C. players
Wilmington Hammerheads FC players
Expatriate soccer players in the United States
National League (English football) players
English expatriate sportspeople in the United States
USL Championship players
Association football midfielders
Association football defenders